Bernhard Gottfried Max Hugo Eberhard, Graf von Schmettow, usually shortened to Eberhard Graf von Schmettow, (17 September 1861 – 21 January 1935) was a German general of World War I.

Biography
Eberhard von Schmettow was born in Halberstadt, Prussia, as son of Maximilian Graf von Schmettow on 17 September 1861. In 1881 he joined an Uhlan regiment of the Prussian Army and spent the next 25 years as cavalry and staff officer; also serving as an aide-de-camp to Emperor Wilhelm II. He became commander of the 1st Life Cuirassier Regiment in 1906, of the 5th Cavalry Brigade in 1911 and of the Guards Hussar Brigade in 1912. Von Schmettow was promoted to Generalmajor in January 1913.

When World War I began General von Schmettow was briefly on the Western Front before being sent to the Eastern Front, given command of the 9th Cavalry Division and, in 1915, the 8th Cavalry Division. In August 1916 he briefly commanded the 195th Infantry Division and was promoted to Generalleutnant. He was assigned to lead the newly created Cavalry Corps Schmettow as part of the 9th Army during the Romanian campaign. It initially consisted of the remnants of the 3rd Cavalry Division, the 1st Austrian Cavalry Division and the 51st Hungarian Honved Infantry Division. For his services in the campaign Schmettow received the Pour le Merite.

In early 1917 Schmettow and his corps were transferred to the Western Front and made up of the 6th and 7th Cavalry Divisions. Shortly afterwards the corps changed, dismounting and exchanging most of the mounted units as cavalry was less needed, and was renamed 65th Corps or Gendkdo z.b.V. 65 ("General Command for Special Use"). Schmettow fought in the 2nd and the 3rd Battle of the Aisne. Close to the end of the war the corps, by now consisting of the 5th, 50th and 216th Infantry Divisions as well as the 4th Guards Infantry Division, participated in the Second Battle of the Marne. For his services in the later Schmettow received the oak leaves to his Pour le Merite.

After the armistice General von Schmettow resigned his commission and ended his military service on 22 February 1919; passing away in Görlitz on 21 January 1935. 

Family

He was married to Agnes von Rundstedt - sister of the famous Wehrmacht Field Marshall - and had three daughters and two sons. Eberhard also was a cousin of contemporary and fellow cavalry general Egon Graf von Schmettow.

One of his sons, Leutnant Maximilian von Schmettow, fell at Cunel in 1918. His other son, Rudolf von Schmettow, served in his father's regiment and later became a general-leutnant in the Wehrmacht. He commanded German troops in the Channel Islands, where his honourable, chivalrous and sensible influence was eventually recognised as key to the relative absence of extremism and oppression during the occupation.

Dates of rank
16.04.1881 - Sekonde-Lieutenant
15.02.1890 - Premier-Lieutenant
15.12.1894 - Rittmeister
18.04.1901 - Major
10.04.1906 - Oberstleutnant
20.04.1909 - Oberst
27.01.1913 - Generalmajor
18.08.1916 - Generalleutnant

Honours and awards
German orders and decorations

Foreign orders and decorations
 : Knight of the Iron Crown, 1st Class with War Decoration, 1915
 : Knight of St. Alexander
 : Commander of the Dannebrog, 2nd Class, 3 April 1903
 :
 Knight of Saints Maurice and Lazarus
 Commander of the Crown of Italy
 : Knight of St. Stanislaus, 3rd Class
 : Knight of the Military Merit Order, 2nd Class
 : Honorary Commander of the Royal Victorian Order, 27 February 1905

See also
 Cavalry Corps Schmettow

References

External links
 Biographical entry at The Prussian Machine

1861 births
1935 deaths
Von Schmettow family
German Army generals of World War I
Cavalry commanders
Recipients of the Pour le Mérite (military class)
Recipients of the Iron Cross (1914), 2nd class
Recipients of the Iron Cross (1914), 1st class
Commanders Second Class of the Order of the Dannebrog
Knights of the Order of Saints Maurice and Lazarus
Recipients of the Order of the Crown (Italy)
Honorary Commanders of the Royal Victorian Order
Crosses of Military Merit
Military personnel from Saxony-Anhalt
People from Halberstadt